Rafah Nanjeba Torsa (born 9 September 1998) is a Bangladeshi television  host, actress and beauty pageant titleholder who was crowned Miss World Bangladesh 2019. She represented Bangladesh at Miss World 2019.

Biography
Torsa's father, Sheikh Morshed, was a lawyer and her mother, Sharmina Akter, is a housewife. Her father died in 2014. She has a younger brother.

Torsa is an artist; a trained bharatanatyam and kathak dancer; a theatre artist, mime artist, reciter, and singer. From the age of 11, she's been working as a volunteer in the Lions Clubs International as a "LEO." She received the first prize in folk dancing in the Bangabandhu Shishu Kishor Competition 2009 from Bangladeshi Prime Minister Sheikh Hasina. She also won a government grant to visit Japan, but could not attend as she was representing Bangladesh in a miming competition in Delhi.

Torsa won a gold medal for bharatanatyam in the National Youth Competition 2010. She was the first runner up of NTV's Marks All Rounder Competition in 2010. She won the first prize in Chittagong divisional competition of the National Science Competition 2015. She also acted in a 2017 Bangladeshi film, Haldaa, which was directed by Tauquir Ahmed.  She is a third year graduate student of the International Relations Department of University of Chittagong. Rafah Nanjeba Torsa is also the founder of a non-profit organization named " The Smile Foundation " which started its journey in 2019.

Pageantry

Miss World Bangladesh 2019

 Torsa was crowned as Miss World Bangladesh 2019 on 11 October 2019. She was crowned by the outgoing titleholder Jannatul Ferdous Oishee, Miss World Bangladesh 2018.

Miss World 2019
Torsa represented Bangladesh at Miss World 2019 in London, United Kingdom. She was able to win the first head to head challenge against four countries

References

External links 
 
 

Bangladeshi beauty pageant winners
Bangladeshi female models
Living people
Miss World 2019 delegates
People from Chittagong District
Bangladeshi film actresses
Bangladeshi television presenters
Bangladeshi women television presenters
1998 births
Chittagong Cantonment Public College alumni